Gérin is a French surname.  Notable people with this name include:

Gérin, one of the paladins of Charlemagne's court
André Gerin (born 1946), French politician
Elzéar Gérin (1843–1887), Canadian politician
François Gérin (1944–2005), Canadian politician and lawyer
Henri Gérin (1900–1941), Canadian politician
John T. Gerin, American physician at Auburn State Prison in Auburn, New York
Léon Gérin (1863–1951), Canadian lawyer, civil servant, and sociologist
Léon-Denis Gérin (1894–1975), Canadian politician
Maksim Gerin (born 1984), Russian footballer
Winifred Gérin (1901–1981), English biographer

Aircraft
Gérin 1936 Varivol biplane

See also
Gérin-Lajoie
Gérin-Lajoie family

French-language surnames